Istanbul Sabahattin Zaim University is a Turkish private higher-education institution established by "İlim Yayma Vakfı" (literally: Foundation for Popularization of Science) on April 24, 2010. The education at the university began in the 2011–12 term.

The university was named after Sabahattin Zaim (1926-2007), who was a professor of economics in the Faculty of Economics at Istanbul University until 1993. A Macedonian from birth, he served as the founding rector of the International University of Sarajevo in 2003-04 after he taught at several universities in and outside Turkey. He was also a founding member of İlim Yayma Vakfı.

The university's main campus is located in Halkalı, Küçükçekmece, Faculty building is situated in Altunizade and the some Research Centers in Eyüp.

Academics 
As of March 2017, the university consists of following units:

Faculties
Faculty of Education
 Mentorship and Psychological Consulting.
 English language Teach
 Pre-school Teach
 Turkish language Teach
 Teacher Training in Arabic
 Special Education Teaching
 Faculty of Law
Law
Faculty of Engineering and Natural Sciences
 Architecture
 Electrical & Electronics Engineering
 Computer engineering
 Software Engineering
 Food engineering

Industrial Engineering 
 Interior Architecture and Environmental Design
Faculty of Business administration
 Business administration (English language)
 Economics (English language)
 International Trade and Finance)
 Islamic Economics and Finance
Faculty of Human and Social Sciences
 Political Science and International Relations (English language)
 History
 Psychology
 Sociology 
Faculty of Health Care
 Nursing
 Department of Social Work 
 Health Management
 Nutrition and Dietetics 
Faculty of Islamic Sciences
 Islamic Science
Faculty of Medicine

Institutes 

INSTITUTE OF SCIENCE AND TECHNOLOGY
 Architecture(Doctore) (Thesis)
 Computer Science and Engineering(Doctore) (Thesis/Non thesis)
 Food Engineering(Doctore) (Thesis/Non thesis)
 Urbanism and Urban Transformation (Doctore)
 Urban Studies and Management (Thesis/Non thesis)
 Nutrition and Dietetics (Thesis/Non thesis)
 Occupational Health and Safety (Thesis/Non thesis)
 INSTITUTE OF SOCIAL SCIENCES
Business Administration(Doctore)(Thesis/Non thesis)
Education Administration and Supervision(Doctore) (Thesis/Non thesis)
English Language and Literature(Doctore)
English Language Teaching (Thesis)
History and Civilization Studies(Doctore)
Islamic Economics and International Finance(Doctore)
Islamic Economics and Law (Arabic)(Doctore)(Thesis/Non thesis)
Islamic Sciences(Doctore) (Thesis/Non thesis)
Public law(Doctore) (Thesis/Non thesis)
Political Science and International Relations (Doctore)(Thesis/Non thesis)
Social Work(Doctore) (Thesis/Non thesis)
Sociology(Doctore) (Thesis/Non thesis)
Education Administration(Thesis/Non thesis)
Psychological Counseling and Guidance(Thesis/Non thesis)
International Finance and Participation Banking(Thesis/Non thesis)
Family Counseling and Education(Thesis/Non thesis)
History and Civilization Studies(Thesis/Non thesis)

Vocational higher schools
Higher school for Foreign languages
 English language Interpreter-Translator
 Higher school for Physical Education and Sports

Institutes
 Institute of Social Science
 Institute of Natural Science

See also
 List of universities in Turkey

References

External links

 

Istanbul Sabahattin Zaim University
Educational institutions established in 2010
Private universities and colleges in Turkey
2010 establishments in Turkey
Eyüp